Arthur Ivan Allin  (3 December 1847 – 31 January 1926) was a Danish violinist, organist, conductor and composer.

Arthur Allin has never specialized himself as a musician.  As his interests have been many-sided, his field of work has been extensive, more so presumably than he dreamed when he, as a 12-year-old boy, stepped into Tivoli Gardens and beat the little drum in "Old Lumbye's" orchestra.

Arthur Ivan Allin was born in Copenhagen, Denmark 3 December 1847.  In the days of his childhood he had music instructions from Adolf Hartmann (piano), Valdemar Tofte (violin), and Peter Rasmussen (theory).

Career 
In Tivoli he played on and off until 1874.  Then he wanted to move away from the capital and became organist in Rønne (1875–1880), at St. Peter's Church in Næstved (1881–89) and Aarhus Cathedral (1888–1915)  where he succeeded Robert Allen.  While in Aarhus he also took a job as conductor of the Centralized "Jyske Sang" Associations from 1189-1914.  Allin's name is attached firmly to the latter city's musical life through these 26 years.

Arthur Allin became a symbol of unity within various musical undertakings.  Thus he was one time the president of Aarhus Music Association and made himself famous throughout Denmark as one of the most capable Danish conductors at the time; for 25 years he was the chief conductor of the centralized Jutlandish Choral Societies and was engaged greatly as a music teacher, concert artist, choir instructor, composer, and journalist.

The public does not have a real impression of the composer Arthur Allin, because in proportion to what he has composed only a small part has been played and still a smaller part has been published.  But considering what is and has been available there is no doubt that it includes many interesting things, and looking at the list of his compositions also tells us that the composer's litheness enables him to move in widely different fields.

Thus he has composed music for five dramatic works, among others for "Antigone" by Sophokles, and "Hannele" by Hauptmann, and for six of David's Psalms.  He has composed two symphonies, two string-quartets, five overtures, a pantomime suite, and various other orchestra pieces, the choral works "Absalon", "Thyra Danebod", "The Woman With the Eggs", "The Taking of Jericho", twelve cantatas for various occasions, ten organ fantasies, about fifty organ preludes, piano music, a ballad opera, choir pieces and songs for one voice and piano among these the oriental "Haifa-songs" and the cycle "Wanderung im Gebirge" by Lenau, superb things which with great applause were sung among other occasions at the composition evening in Copenhagen in February 1915.

After 40 years, during which time he was knighted "Ridder af Dannebroge", he returned in 1915 to his native town and continued his composition activity and his work as editor of the "Danish organist and precentor association's" member periodical.

He was married to Bertha Josephine Lund and together they had twelve children.

References

 The book "Danske Componister I Det 20. Aarhundredes Begyndelse" by Gerhardt Lynge, published 1917, 2nd Edition
 In 1979 Mr. Finn Hoersted Andersen composed a 100 page thesis regarding Arthur Allin for the University of Copenhagen.  A huge amount of time has been spent to find the published as well as the unpublished compositions and to examine them all.  The thesis begins with Arthur Allin's life and activities gathered from many newspapers and from friends and families.  It then goes on to list and examine all the compositions and finally the author says that although Arthur Allin's compositions have been forgotten there are many pieces of music that deserve to be known again.
 The Music Department of the Royal Library of Denmark has much of the manuscripts and prints.

1847 births
1926 deaths
Musicians from Copenhagen
Danish composers
Male composers
Danish classical organists
Male classical organists
Danish classical violinists
Male classical violinists
Danish conductors (music)
Male conductors (music)